Proagomyia is a genus of flies in the family Empididae.

Species
P. torrentium Collin, 1933

References

Empidoidea genera
Empididae